Inula racemosa is an Asian plant in the daisy family native to the temperate and alpine western Himalayas of Xinjiang, Afghanistan, Kashmir, Nepal, Pakistan.

The roots are widely used locally in indigenous medicine as an expectorant and in veterinary medicine as a tonic. It has also been introduced as an ornamental plant and medicinal herb in many countries.

References

External links
Pushkarmool in Ayurvedic Diet Solutions
Plants for a Future Inula royleana

racemosa
Plants described in 1881
Flora of Asia